The 1966 New Hampshire Wildcats football team was an American football team that represented the University of New Hampshire as a member of the Yankee Conference during the 1966 NCAA College Division football season. In its first year under head coach Joe Yukica, the team compiled a 2–6 record (1–4 against conference opponents) and finished last out of six teams in the Yankee Conference.

Schedule

References

New Hampshire
New Hampshire Wildcats football seasons
New Hampshire Wildcats football